Daniel Nana Yeboah (born 20 July 1984) is a Ghanaian former professional footballer who played as a defensive midfielder. Between 2002 and 2008, he made six appearances for the Ghana national team.

Club career
In July 2012, Yeboah joined Egyptian side Al Ittihad on a two-year contract.

International career
Yeboah was member of the Black Stars, he played his debut in 2002 was than four years inactive and was recalled for the game on 11 October 2008 against Lesotho national football team.

References

External links
 

1978 births
Living people
Ghanaian footballers
Association football defenders
Expatriate footballers in Lebanon
Association football midfielders
Asante Kotoko S.C. players
Heart of Lions F.C. players
Nejmeh SC players
Al Masry SC players
Expatriate footballers in Egypt
Ghanaian expatriate sportspeople in Egypt
Ghanaian expatriate footballers
Lebanese Premier League players
Ghanaian expatriate sportspeople in Lebanon
Ghana international footballers
2009 African Nations Championship players
Ghana A' international footballers